Bob Davenport may refer to:
 Bob Davenport (gridiron football)
 Bob Davenport (singer)

See also
 Robert Davenport (disambiguation)